Whitesboro is a city in Grayson County, Texas, United States. The population was 3,793 at the 2010 census. Whitesboro is named for its founder, Ambrose B. White.

It is part of the Sherman-Denison metropolitan area.

History
The area was once known as "Wolfpath". The first settler in the area was Robert Diamond, but the settlement of Wolfpath began with the arrival of Ambrose B. White and his family in 1848. The Butterfield Overland Mail route used White's Westview Inn as the "Diamond Station" on its trail from the Mississippi River to the Pacific Coast from 1858 to 1861. A post office, under the name "Whitesborough", began operations there in 1860.

After the Civil War, Whitesborough grew into a frontier town where female residents were prohibited from leaving their homes on Saturday nights because shootings were so common. Whitesborough had a population of 500, saloons, several stores, and other businesses when it was incorporated on June 2, 1873. By 1879, it had a bank, a newspaper, and train service from Denison on a line from the Missouri, Kansas and Texas Railroad. In 1887, it altered the spelling of its name to "Whitesboro".

In 1903, racial tensions were high in Whitesboro after an "Anti-White Man's Club" left a note threatening to poison local wells and "foully treat" and murder "some white girl". Later that year, a black male was held by police for identification following an alleged attempted rape of a white Whitesboro woman. A large mob broke into the man's cell and attempted to hang him from a tree; he was rescued by police. The mob then fired guns toward homes occupied by blacks, and ordered them to leave town.

Geography
Whitesboro is located in western Grayson County. U.S. Route 82 passes through the north side of the city, and U.S. Route 377 passes through the east side. US 82 leads east  to Sherman, the county seat, and west  to Gainesville, while US 377 leads north  to the Oklahoma border on the Red River and south  to Denton.

Demographics

2020 census

As of the 2020 United States census, there were 4,074 people, 1,593 households, and 1,065 families residing in the city.

2000 census
As of the census of 2000, there were 3,760 people, 1,508 households, and 1,040 families residing in the city. The population density was 1,179.9 people per square mile (455.1/km). There were 1,624 housing units at an average density of 509.6/sq mi (196.6/km). The racial makeup of the city was 96.57% White, 0.19% African American, 0.77% Native American, 0.40% Asian, 0.03% Pacific Islander, 1.09% from other races, and 0.96% from two or more races. Hispanic or Latino of any race were 2.95% of the population.

There were 1,508 households, out of which 33.4% had children under the age of 18 living with them, 53.3% were married couples living together, 12.5% had a female householder with no husband present, and 31.0% were non-families. 28.0% of all households were made up of individuals, and 15.9% had someone living alone who was 65 years of age or older. The average household size was 2.44 and the average family size was 2.97.

In the city, the population was spread out, with 26.3% under the age of 18, 7.1% from 18 to 24, 26.3% from 25 to 44, 20.1% from 45 to 64, and 20.2% who were 65 years of age or older. The median age was 38 years. For every 100 females, there were 87.0 males. For every 100 females age 18 and over, there were 82.4 males.

The median income for a household in the city was $31,296, and the median income for a family was $43,150. Males had a median income of $30,165 versus $22,991 for females. The per capita income for the city was $15,865. About 8.5% of families and 12.2% of the population were below the poverty line, including 16.2% of those under age 18 and 11.7% of those age 65 or over. There are still relatives of Ambros White living in Whitesboro.

Education
The city is served by the Whitesboro Independent School District.

Notable people

 Rayford Barnes (1920–2000), actor
 Lydia Starr McPherson (1827–1903), founded Whitesboro Democrat newspaper in the late 1870s
 Jared L. Patterson, member of Texas House of Representatives
 Ray Renfro, professional football player
 Grizzly Smith, professional wrestler

See also

 List of cities in Texas

References

External links

 
 Whitesboro Chamber of Commerce

Cities in Grayson County, Texas
Cities in Texas
Butterfield Overland Mail in Texas
Stagecoach stops in the United States